NVC community M24 (Molinia caerulea - Cirsium dissectum fen-meadow)is one of the 38 mire communities in the British National Vegetation Classification system.

Community Composition

The following species are found in this community

  Molinia caerulea (Purple Moor Grass)
  Cirsium dissectum (Meadow Thistle)

References

 JNCC Report  No. 394  The European context of British Lowland Grasslands  J.S. Rodwell1, V. Morgan2, R.G. Jefferson3 & D. Moss4  February 2007  JNCC, Peterborough 2007 |http://jncc.defra.gov.uk/pdf/jncc394_webpt2v2.pdf
 JNCC National Vegetation Classification field guide to mires and heaths|http://jncc.defra.gov.uk/page-2628

M24
dissectum, NVC
Molinia caerulea Cirsium dissectum fen-meadow
NVC
NVC
NVC
NVC